Israel competed at the 2022 European Championships in Munich from August 11 to August 21, 2022.

Medallists

Competitors
The following is the list of number of competitors in the Championships:

Athletics

Beach Volleyball

Israel has qualified 1 male pair.

Canoeing and Paracanoeing

Men

Qualification Legend: F or FA=Final A (medal); FB=Final B (non-medal); SF= Semifinal; BT=Qualified by Time

Women

Qualification Legend: F or FA=Final A (medal); FB=Final B (non-medal); SF= Semifinal; BT=Qualified by Time; KO=Last Place Knock Out

Cycling

Track

Elimination race

Madison

Omnium

Points race

Pursuit

Scratch

Mountain biking

Road

Men

Women

Gymnastics
Israel has entered five senior male, five senior female, five Junior male, and four Junior female athletes.

Men

Team & Individual All-Round Finals

Individual Apparatus

Women

Team & Individual All-Round Finals

Individual Apparatus

Rowing and Para-rowing

Men

Qualification Legend: FA=Final A (medal); FB/FC/FD=Final B/C/D (non-medal); SA/B= Semifinal A/B; SC/D= Semifinal C/D; R =Repechage

Women

Qualification Legend: FA=Final A (medal)

Sport climbing

Boulder

Lead

Combined

Table Tennis

Men

Mixed

Triathlon

References

2022
Nations at the 2022 European Championships
European Championships